Alessandro Deiola (born 1 August 1995) is an Italian footballer who plays as a midfielder for  club Cagliari.

Career
Born in San Gavino Monreale, Province of South Sardinia, Sardinia, Deiola began his career at nearby Cagliari. For the 2014–15 season, he was loaned to Tuttocuoio in Lega Pro. He made his debut for the Pisan club on 30 August 2014, playing the full 90 minutes in a goalless home draw against Carrarese. His first goal came on 28 September, a fifth-minute opener in a 3–2 defeat at AC Pistoiese; in total he scored four goals in 33 games, all but two as a starter.

On 9 August 2015, Deiola made his Cagliari debut, playing the full 90 minutes of a 5–0 win over Virtus Entella at the Stadio Sant'Elia in the Coppa Italia second round, scoring the final goal. He headed the opener in the 1–1 draw at Trapani in the next round six days later, with his team advancing in a penalty shootout.

On the last day of the winter transfer market session in 2017, he returned from the loan to Cagliari.

On 17 August 2018, he joined Parma on loan. He returned to Cagliari on 22 January 2019.

On 10 January 2020, he joined Lecce on loan with a purchase option.

On 22 September 2020, Deiola returned to Spezia on loan for the 2020–21 season. He made 12 Serie A appearances for the side before Cagliari requested his early return in January 2021.

Career statistics

References

External links
 

Living people
1995 births
People from the Province of South Sardinia
Italian footballers
Association football midfielders
Cagliari Calcio players
Spezia Calcio players
Parma Calcio 1913 players
U.S. Lecce players
A.C. Tuttocuoio 1957 San Miniato players
Serie A players
Serie B players
Serie C players
Footballers from Sardinia